Beni Suef University is an institution of higher education located in Beni Suef, Egypt.

History
Although established as an independent university in 2005, it began on 1976 as a branch of Cairo University. Finally, the presidential decree N.184 dated 2005 was issued to establish Beni-Suef University.

Organization

Faculties and institutes
There are 32 faculties as well as one institute of the Beni Suef University, each with its own internal structure and activities. The heads of Beni Suef faculties are known as dean. The faculties and institutes join as the committee of to discuss policy and to deal with the central administration. The university and its faculties provide social, cultural, and recreational activities for their members and students. Faculties fellow the rules of ministry of higher education for admitting undergraduate.

Humanities and Social Sciences
Faculties of Commerce, Law, Education and Arts.

Medical and Life Sciences
Faculties of Veterinary Medicine, Science, Medicine, Pharmacy, Nursing, Physical Education as well as Institute of Nursing.

Engineering
Faculty of Computers and Artificial Intelligence beside Faculties of Industrial Education and Engineering.

Teaching and degrees
Bachelor and licence degrees are provided depending on the faculties. Research degrees at the Master's and Ph.D levels are conferred in all subjects studied at graduate level at the university.

External links 
 Beni Suef University
 Beni-Suef University Journal of Basic and Applied Sciences 

Universities in Egypt
Beni Suef
Educational institutions established in 2005
2005 establishments in Egypt